DOS 3 or DOS-3 may refer to:
 Kosmos 557 aka Salyut-3 or DOS-3, a Russian space station
 Apple DOS for the Apple II series, released in versions 3.1, 3.2, and 3.3
 Atari DOS 3 for the Atari 8-bit family

It may also refer to versions of the Microsoft MS-DOS family:
 MS-DOS 3.0, with FAT16 support in 1984
 MS-DOS 3.1 in 1985
 MS-DOS 3.2 in 1985
 MS-DOS 3.21 in 1987
 MS-DOS 3.21R, a ROMed version of MS-DOS in 1989 for laptops
 MS-DOS 3.22, a ROMed OEM version of MS-DOS for HP 95LX in 1991
 MS-DOS 3.25
 MS-DOS 3.3 in 1987
 MS-DOS 3.3A
 Arabic MS-DOS 3.3, a special Arabic version of MS-DOS 3.3 (ADOS) in 1988
 Hebrew MS-DOS 3.3, a special Hebrew version of MS-DOS 3.3 (HDOS)
 MS-DOS 3.3R, a ROMed version of MS-DOS in 1990 for TI laptops
 MS-DOS 3.31, an OEM version of MS-DOS with FAT16B support by Compaq
 MS-DOS 3.30+,an OEM version of MS-DOS with FAT16B support by Zenith-Data System 
 MS-DOS 3.40, announced OEM version and successor of MS-DOS 3.3 with FAT16B support in 1988

It may also refer to versions of the IBM PC DOS family:
 PC DOS 3.0, successor of PC DOS 2.11 with FAT16 support in 1984
 PC DOS 3.1, successor of PC DOS 3.0 in 1984/1985
 PC DOS 3.2, successor of PC DOS 3.1 in 1986
 PC DOS 3.21, successor of PC DOS 3.2 in 1986
 IBM DOS 3.3, successor of PC DOS 3.21 in 1987
 IBM DOS 3.4, announced successor of IBM DOS 3.3 in 1988

It may also refer to versions of the Digital Research DR DOS family:
 DR DOS 3.31, based on DOS Plus 2.1 and Concurrent PC DOS 6.0 with FAT16B support in 1988
 DR DOS 3.32, successor of DR DOS 3.31 in 1988, reporting itself as "PC DOS 3.31"
 DR DOS 3.33, successor of DR DOS 3.32 in 1988, reporting itself as "PC DOS 3.31"
 DR DOS 3.34, successor of DR DOS 3.33 in 1988, reporting itself as "PC DOS 3.31"
 DR DOS 3.35, successor of DR DOS 3.34 in 1988, reporting itself as "PC DOS 3.31"
 DR DOS 3.40, successor of DR DOS 3.35, reporting itself as "PC DOS 3.31"
 DR DOS 3.41, successor of DR DOS 3.40 in 1989, reporting itself as "PC DOS 3.31"
 DR DOS 5.0, successor of DR DOS 3.41 in 1990, reporting itself as "PC DOS 3.31"
 DR DOS 6.0, successor of DR DOS 5.0 in 1991, reporting itself as "PC DOS 3.31"
 NetWare PalmDOS 1.0, a successor to DR DOS 6.0 tailored for early palmtop PCs in 1992, reporting itself as "PC DOS 3.31"

See also 
 Microsoft Windows NTDOS 30.00
 DOS (disambiguation)
 DOS 2 (disambiguation)
 DOS 4 (disambiguation)
 DOS/360
 DOS 386 (disambiguation)